Shingo Kunieda defeated Gustavo Fernández in the final, 7–6(7–0), 6–4 to win the men's singles wheelchair tennis title at the 2014 US Open. It was his fifth US Open singles title and 16th major singles title overall.

Stéphane Houdet was the defending champion, but was defeated by Fernández in the semifinals.

Seeds
 Shingo Kunieda (champion)
 Stéphane Houdet (semifinals)

Draw

Bracket

External links 

 Draw

Wheelchair Men's Singles
U.S. Open, 2014 Men's Singles